A jam session is a relatively informal musical event, process, or activity where musicians, typically instrumentalists, play improvised solos and vamp on tunes, songs and chord progressions.

Jam session may also refer to:

Jam Session (1942 film), a short film featuring Duke Ellington
 Jam Session (1944 film), an American film by Charles Barton
Jam Session (software), a 1986 software program for Macintosh computers for music creation and playback
Jam Session (1999 film), a Japanese documentary about the making of Kikujiro
Jam Sessions, a 2007 video game
 Jam Session (album)

See also
Jamming (dance)